One Night with the King is a 2006 American religious epic film produced by Matt Crouch and Laurie Crouch of Gener8Xion Entertainment, directed by Michael O. Sajbel, and starring Peter O'Toole, Tiffany Dupont, John Rhys-Davies and Luke Goss.

The screenplay by Stephan Blinn is based on Tommy Tenney and Mark Andrew Olsen's novel Hadassah: One Night with the King. One Night with the King is a dramatization of the Biblical story of Esther, who risked her life by approaching the King of Persia to request that he save the Jewish people.

Despite being a critical and commercial failure, it received a 2007 CAMIE Award for Goss' portrayal of King Xerxes.

Plot
The film is set in Susa, Persia (modern-day Iran) King Xerxes holds a great feast for all the people to attend. An orphaned Jewish woman, Hadassah, longs to go to Jerusalem to see the Holy Land and prepares to leave with the caravan along with her friend, Jesse. They stop by the king's feast before he goes marching to war to avenge his father's death. Hadassah and Jesse witness the king summoning Queen Vashti. Queen Vashti was opposed to the war, desiring King Xerxes to enhance his kingdom instead. She holds her own feast in protest against the war. When the king summons her to his feast, she refuses to come, stating, "I am queen and I will not lower my dignity. Or shame my crown by wearing it before your drunk and thinly veiled war council". Because of this, King Xerxes is advised to banish her and select a more worthy queen.

All beautiful unmarried women in the city of Susa are brought to Xerxes. Under the command of her overprotective cousin, Mordecai (who was one of the king's scribes and worked in the palace) Hadassah does not reveal her nationality or family and changes her name to "Esther" (after the Babylonian goddess Ishtar) she is taken in with the rest of the selected women and given cosmetics, perfumes and treatments under the care of Hegai, the king's royal eunuch. Through her quick wit, intelligence and integrity, she becomes Hegai's favorite.

On their night with the king, each female candidate is allowed to bring along whatever she wishes from the harem. She goes in the evening and returns in the morning to a second harem. She will not be able to return to the king unless she pleases him and he summons her by name. During their preparation, Hegai discovers that Esther can read and listens to her reading to the other contenders. He admires her bravery. Late into the night, he brings her to King Xerxes to read to him. She starts reading from the assigned scroll and then begins telling the love story of Jacob and Rachel (from the Old Testament) he is amused and intrigued and dismisses her, saying that she shall read to him again. Esther falls in love with the king. When it is Esther's turn for her "one night with the king", she only wears what Hegai advises. She wins the king's favor by revealing her heart to him. He chooses her and crowns her queen.

Meanwhile, Haman the Agagite is promoted to the highest-ranking official. He has all the king's servants at the royal gate to kneel before him. Mordecai refuses, declaring that he will only kneel before God and the king. He announces himself before Haman to be a son of Abraham, a Jew. Haman, filled with vengeance and hatred, seeks to destroy Mordecai and all his people because generations earlier; Jews persecuted his forefathers.

Esther discovers the plot and breaks protocol by going before the king unsummoned, risking her life to plead for her people. The king spares her life out of his love for her. She invites the king and Haman to a banquet and there reveals her nationality and Haman's plot to kill the Jews. The king, overwhelmed by her revelation, leaves the banquet. Haman then attacks Esther. The king saves her and commands Haman be hanged on the gallows he had erected to hang Mordecai. After Haman is taken away for his execution, the king goes to Esther's side. Esther asks, "what made you come back"?. And the king responds with, "I saw the stars". Then King Xerxes kisses Esther.

Mordecai is made a prince of Persia and issues a royal decree in his own name, with flashbacks of Esther being made queen and the crowd of Jews cheering in the streets. Mordecai proclaims, "I order this decree sent out under the great seal of Mordecai, Prince of Persia, a Jew".

Modification
The film generally adheres to the main plot of the Biblical version. However, the film adds stylistic elements not present in the Biblical story, as well as depicting several non-Biblical minor characters.

Production and sales
The movie's Premiere Night took place at Mann Bruins Theater in Los Angeles, California. The movie, filmed entirely in the state of Rajasthan, India, was released in theaters on October 13, 2006. During its opening weekend, it earned $4,120,497 in theaters. By the end of its theatrical run, the film had earned $13,395,961 domestically, and $13,728,450 worldwide.

Cast
Tiffany Dupont as Hadassah/Esther, the main protagonist. The orphaned future queen and cousin of Mordecai. Esther's parents died; prior to the start of the film.
Luke Goss as King Xerxes I of Persia, Esther's husband; who is insecure in his new position as king. 
John Rhys-Davies as Mordecai, Esther's overprotective cousin and father-figure. Esther's nickname for Mordecai is Uncle Mordecai. Moredcai took Esther in after her parents died.
Omar Sharif as Prince Memucan, one of the few truly loyal Princes of Persia. 
Tommy Lister, Jr. as Hegai, the Royal Eunuch, the harem's bodyguard.
Jonah Lotan as Jesse, Esther's close friend who becomes a Eunuch in the Persian palace.
John Noble as Prince Admatha, a scheming prince who plots to become king himself. 
James Callis as Haman, the Agagite, the film's main antagonist, Haman tries to use his position to kill the Jewish inhabitants of Persia. Scenes including Haman and his followers in the film make use of imagery associated with Nazism, including swastika-like symbols and torchlit nighttime rallies.
Peter O'Toole as Prophet Samuel
Denzil Smith as Prince Carshena
Jyoti Dogra as Queen of Persia Vashti
Tom Alter as King Saul of Israel
Aditya Bal as Amalekite King Agag
Dilshad Patel as Hannah
Nimrat Kaur as Sarah
Asif Basra as Cameo Role

Production

The movie was filmed entirely in the state of Rajasthan, India.

Jeannie Tenney wrote and sang "One Night with the King", which can be heard during the final credits. She was a co-author with her husband, Tommy Tenney (also a producer of the film), of the book upon which the film is based.

Promotion
The Genius Club from writer/director Tim Chey was also released theatrically in 2006. The film's trailers showed before One Night With The King.

Reception

Box office
One Night with the King was released to theaters on October 13, 2006. During its opening weekend, it earned $4,120,497 in theaters. By the end of its theatrical run, the film had received $13,395,961 domestically, with $13,728,450 worldwide.  Subsequent DVD sales were strong at $20,688,299, more than making up for production costs.

Critical response
One Night with the King received a generally negative reception, garnering a 19% positive rating on Rotten Tomatoes, based on 26 reviews, with an average of 4.4 out of 10.

V.A. Musetto of the New York Post, noting that, "The cinematography and sets look great, but the script is a bummer. It's overlong, overwrought and overblown."

The film received better views from the Christian community. The film was awarded four Doves by the Dove Foundation and received the Dove Family-Approved Seal. MovieGuide has also reviewed the film fairly favourably, giving it 3 out of 4 stars, saying that "despite some minor flaws, [it] brings back the biblical epic in an entertaining, inspiring way." The movie has also been endorsed by the American Bible Society.

Classification
The British Board of Film Classification granted this motion picture a PG certificate, noting that it contained "images of moderate battle violence".

In the US, One Night With The King is also rated PG by the MPAA for violence, some sensuality and thematic elements.

See also
Esther and the King (1960 film)
Esther (1999 film) 
The Book of Esther (2013 film)
List of historical drama films
Book of Esther
Esther

References

External links

Grace-Centered Magazine Christian Movie Review
One Night With the King MovieGuide Review
Financial data from Yahoo!

2006 films
Films set in ancient Persia
Religious epic films
American independent films
Cultural depictions of Esther
Cultural depictions of Xerxes I
Films based on the Book of Esther
Films about Jews and Judaism
Films about antisemitism
Films set in the 5th century BC
Films shot in Rajasthan
Films based on American novels
Films based on adaptations
Films shot in India
Films scored by J. A. C. Redford
2000s English-language films
2000s American films